Mark Irish (born 25 August 1981) is an English rugby union footballer who plays at prop for London Scottish.

Irish joined Gloucester from amateur club Bridgwater but failed to play a first team game and was released at the end of the 2003-04 season. He signed a 2-year contract with Bristol in February 2005.

Irish is a former England U21 international.

External links
Bristol profile
Gloucester profile

1981 births
Living people
Bristol Bears players
English rugby union players
Rugby union players from Bridgwater
Rugby union props